Niall Collins (born 30 March 1973) is an Irish Fianna Fáil politician who has served as Minister of State for Skills and Further Education since July 2020. He has been a Teachta Dála (TD) for the Limerick County constituency since 2016, and from 2011 to 2016 for the Limerick constituency and from 2007 to 2011 for the Limerick West constituency.

He served as a member of Limerick County Council for the Bruff Local electoral area, being first elected to the council at the 2004 local elections. Collins was first elected to Dáil Éireann at the 2007 general election for Limerick West. He was elected on the first count; he received the ninth-highest vote in the country and the highest vote of any of the newcomers to the 30th Dáil.

His grandfather James Collins represented Limerick West in the Dáil from 1948 until 1967. His uncle Gerry Collins is a former Minister and MEP, who was a TD for Limerick West from 1967 to 1997. Another uncle, Michael J. Collins, sat for Limerick West in the Dáil from 1997 until he retired in 2007.

He has served in various Fianna Fáil Front Bench roles, he has served as Opposition Spokesperson for Justice and Equality from 2011 to 2016, Opposition Spokesperson for Jobs, Enterprise and Innovation from May 2016 to March 2018 and Opposition Spokesperson for Foreign Affairs and Trade from March 2018 to June 2020.

Collins was appointed Minister of State at the Department of Further and Higher Education, Research, Innovation and Science with responsibility for Skills and Further Education in July 2020.

See also
Families in the Oireachtas

References

External links
Niall Collins' page on Fianna Fáil website

 

1973 births
Living people
Fianna Fáil TDs
Local councillors in County Limerick
Members of the 30th Dáil
Members of the 31st Dáil
Members of the 32nd Dáil
Members of the 33rd Dáil
People educated at St Munchin's College
Politicians from County Limerick
Ministers of State of the 33rd Dáil